A salvage tug, known also historically as a wrecking tug, is a specialized type of tugboat that is used to rescue ships that are in distress or in danger of sinking, or to salvage ships that have already sunk or run aground.

Overview 
Few tugboats have ever been truly fully dedicated to salvage work; most of the time, salvage tugs operate towing barges, platforms, ships, or performing other utility tugboat work.

Tugs fitted out for salvage are found in small quantities around the globe, with higher concentrations near areas with both heavy shipping traffic and hazardous weather conditions.

Salvage tugs are used by specialized crew experienced in salvage operations (salvors). Their particular equipment includes:
 extensive towing provisions and extra tow lines/cables, with provisions for towing from both bow and stern and at irregular angles
 extra cranes
 firefighting gear
 deluge systems
 hoses
 nozzles
 mechanical equipment such as:
 common mechanical repair parts
 compressed air gear
 diving equipment
 steel for hull patches
 welding equipment
 pumps

Modern development 

The total demand for salvage tug services is significantly down from its peaks in the years around World War II.

The increasing sensitivity of societies and legal systems to environmental damage and the increasing size of ships has to some extent offset the decline in the number of salvage operations undertaken. Accidents such as major oil tanker groundings or sinkings may require extensive salvage efforts to try to minimize the environmental damage such as that caused by the Exxon Valdez oil spill, or the Amoco Cadiz and Torrey Canyon disasters.

In popular culture

In film
The Key, based on a novel by Jan de Hartog, is about WWII Admiralty tug operations.
 In 1943, Jacques Cousteau's team made the film Épaves (Shipwrecks).
 Ghost Ship is a film about an ocean liner which disappeared in mysterious circumstances and is discovered by a maritime salvage contractor.

In television
Shipwreck Men (2013) is a reality TV series that follows crews who salvage and raise wrecked vessels.

In literature
 Farley Mowat's historical books The Grey Seas Under and The Serpent's Coil detail North Atlantic salvage operations in the 1930s, 1940s, and 1950s by salvage tugs operated by the firm Foundation Maritime.
 Wilbur Smith's novel Hungry as the Sea is a tale about the master of a salvage tugboat and her operations

See also
 Admiralty tug
 Anchor handling tug supply vessel
 Emergency tow vessel
 Fireboat
 Marine salvage
 Rescue and salvage ship
 Tugboat

References

Farley Mowat: The Grey Seas Under: The Perilous Rescue Mission of a N.A. Salvage Tug (on the salvage career of the tug Foundation Franklin). The Lyons Press, 2001,   (First published as The Grey Seas Under, Little, Brown & Co., 1958)
 A Reassessment of the Marine Salvage Posture of the United States, ed National Research Council Committee on Marine Salvage Issues, Marine Board, Commission on Engineering and Technical Systems., National Academy Press, Washington, D.C., 1994

External links
 International Salvage Union, trade association for salvage tugs
 International Tug and Salvage magazine, website
 Salvage World magazine, International Salvage Union, also available online at www.marine-salvage.com
 Sampling of salvage companies
 Donjon Marine Co., a US-based tug and salvage company
 Gigilinis Shipping, a Greek maritime company with salvage operations
 Resolve Marine Group , a Global US based maritime emergency response company.
 Smit Internationale
 SvitzerWijsmuller
 Titan Salvage   a Global US based salvage company with offices around the world.
 United Salvage, a UK/Australian/South Pacific salvage company

Tugboats
Marine salvage